"Don't Think Twice, It's All Right" is a song written by Bob Dylan in 1962, recorded on November 14 that year, and released on the 1963 album The Freewheelin' Bob Dylan and as the b-side of the Blowin' in the Wind single.  The song was covered by several other artists, including Peter, Paul and Mary who released it as a single which reached the Top 10 of the Billboard Hot 100.

Composition
In the liner notes to the original release, Nat Hentoff calls the song "a statement that maybe you can say to make yourself feel better ... as if you were talking to yourself." It was written around the time that Suze Rotolo indefinitely prolonged her stay in Italy.  The melody is based on the public domain traditional song "Who's Gonna Buy Your Chickens When I'm Gone", which was taught to Dylan by folksinger Paul Clayton, who had used it in his song "Who's Gonna Buy You Ribbons When I'm Gone?"

As well as the melody, a couple of lines were taken from Clayton's "Who's Gonna Buy You Ribbons When I'm Gone?", which was recorded in 1960, two years before Dylan wrote "Don't Think Twice". Lines taken word-for-word or slightly altered from the Clayton song are, "T'ain't no use to sit and wonder why, darlin'," and, "So I'm walkin' down that long, lonesome road." On the first release of the song, instead of "So I'm walkin' down that long, lonesome road babe, where I'm bound, I can't tell" Dylan sings "So long, honey babe, where I'm bound, I can't tell". The lyrics were changed when Dylan performed live versions of the song and on cover versions recorded by other artists.

Releases
In addition to its original release, the song has appeared on several of Dylan's greatest hits compilations, including Bob Dylan's Greatest Hits Vol. II (1971), The Best of Bob Dylan (1997), and The Essential Bob Dylan (2000). Another version of the song, recorded as a demo for Dylan's music publisher M. Witmark & Sons in 1963, was included on two releases in Columbia's Bootleg Series: Vol. 7: No Direction Home: The Soundtrack (2005) and Vol. 9 – The Witmark Demos: 1962–1964 (2010). In addition, live versions have been released on Before the Flood (1974; recorded February 14, 1974), as a reggae rock version on Bob Dylan at Budokan (1978; recorded February 28, 1978), The Bootleg Series Vol. 6: Bob Dylan Live 1964, Concert at Philharmonic Hall (2004; recorded October 31, 1964), Live at The Gaslight 1962 (2005; recorded October 15, 1962), and Live 1962-1966: Rare Performances from the Copyright Collections (2018; recorded April 12, 1963).

Cover versions

In 1963, the popular folk trio Peter, Paul and Mary recorded the song.  Dylan's manager Albert Grossman also managed Peter, Paul and Mary and started offering Dylan's songs to other artists to record.  "Don't Think Twice, It's Alright" was one of three Dylan songs Peter, Paul and Mary picked up that way for their third album In the Wind, "Blowin' in the Wind" and "Quit Your Lowdown Ways" being the others.  Released as a single, it reached number nine on the Billboard Hot 100 and number two on its Easy Listening charts.  It was this version that popularized the song.  Cash Box described it as "an infectious medium-paced country-styled folk item with a haunting, extremely pretty melody" that seemed destined to replicate the success the trio had with "Blowin' in the Wind."  AllMusic critic William Ruhlman described the Peter, Paul and Mary version as an "understated rendition" of the song.  Radio personality Bob Leszczak describes this version as being done "in typical fashion."

The Four Seasons released a cover of the song as a single in 1965 (with the title "Don't Think Twice") under the pseudonym the Wonder Who? Their "joke" version reached number 12 on the Hot 100, and eventually sold one million copies.

Before he became famous, Post Malone uploaded a cover version to YouTube in 2013 under his birth name, performed in an earnest folk style unlike his later work. The video was widely viewed in 2015 after his "White Iverson" video went viral on SoundCloud. Lana Del Rey performed the song on her Norman Fucking Rockwell! tour in 2019, joined by Walkmen singer Hamilton Leithauser in Nashville, Tennessee.

In popular culture

The song was used on the AMC television series Mad Men, Friday Night Lights, and Men of a Certain Age. It was also used in Nancy Savoca's 1991 film Dogfight, starring River Phoenix and Lili Taylor; the 2011 film The Help; the October 30, 2016 episode of the AMC television series The Walking Dead; the January 22, 2019 episode of the NBC television series This Is Us (season 3) (episode 11, "Songbird Road Part 1"); the 2019 film The Kitchen (during a funeral scene, the cover version is sung by the artist Melanie); the January 7, 2020 episode of the series Emergence (season 1, episode 10, "15 Years"); and the February 16, 2021 episode of the NBC television series This Is Us (season 5) (episode 8, "In The Room") which featured a cover version sung by the artist John Martyn from his first album, London Conversation. It was also featured in the BBC Scottish sitcom series, Still Game in the final episode, Over the Hill which was played in the final scenes of the show. The song is also heard over the end scenes of the December 16, 2021 episode of the HBO MAX miniseries Station Eleven (season 1, episode 1, “Wheel of Fire.”)

See also
List of Bob Dylan songs based on earlier tunes

References

1962 songs
1965 singles
Songs written by Bob Dylan
Bob Dylan songs
Peter, Paul and Mary songs
Dick and Dee Dee songs
Elvis Presley songs
The Four Seasons (band) songs
Burl Ives songs
Doc Watson songs
Song recordings produced by John Hammond (record producer)
Song recordings produced by Albert Grossman
RPM Top Singles number-one singles
Columbia Records singles
Warner Records singles
Esther & Abi Ofarim songs
Joan Baez songs